Healthcare in Afghanistan is slowly improving after it was almost non-existent due to the decades of war. Currently, there are over 3,000 health facilities found throughout Afghanistan. More than 17,000 health posts have been established in the country, including the first neurosurgery hospital. Latest reports say 38,000 Afghan women work as midwives. Despite the improvements made in the last two decades, Afghanistan's healthcare system remains poor when compared with any of its neighboring countries.

Hospitals

There are over 100 government-run and private or internationally-administered hospitals in Afghanistan. The most advanced medical treatments are available in Kabul followed by in Kandahar, Herat and Mazar-i-Sharif. The French Medical Institute for Children and Indira Gandhi Children's Hospital in Kabul are the leading children's hospitals in the country. The Daoud Khan Military Hospital, Jamhuriat Hospital and Jinnah Hospital are some of the major hospitals in the Kabul area. The 350-bed Aino Mina Hospital and the 50-bed Mohmand Hospital in Kandahar are two of the most modern hospitals in the southern part of the country. In spite of all this, many of the wealthy Afghans still travel to Pakistan, India, Iran, Turkey and other countries for more advanced medical treatment.

Maiwand Teaching Hospital was established in the 1960s, designed to treat between 300-400 patients a day, but in 2019 there are often 1,000 patients in a day.

History

Economically, the Afghans were in better shape than many others in the region. Glenn Foster, an American contractor working in Afghanistan in the 1950s, stated this about the Afghans:

Afghanistan was somewhat ahead of its time until 1978, when the Saur Revolution took place. That revolution led to a continues war and poverty in the region, which began with the closure of borders and suspension of political ties between Afghanistan and its southern and western neighbors (Pakistan and Iran). Many Afghans, especially the elite class who did not want to be involved in the conflict, began escaping from the country in order to reside in other countries. Those leaving included most of the doctors and nurses. By 1992, when a major civil war began in Kabul, nearly all doctors and nurses had immigrated to other countries. Things took a turn in late 2001 when the United Nations decided to rebuild Afghanistan and resolve its political issues.

In 2003, there were 11 physicians and 18 nurses per 100,000 population, and the per capita health expenditure was $28 US dollars. The nation had one medical facility for every 27,000 people in 2004, and some centers were responsible for as many as 300,000 people. An estimated one-quarter of the population had no access to health care. The international organizations provided a large share of medical care. It was reported in 2006 that an estimated 800,000 Afghans are disabled. Infant, child, and maternal mortality rates in Afghanistan reached the highest in the world, by some estimates as high as 275 per 1,000. In rural areas, one in six children die before reaching age five. This is because of poor sanitation and insufficient potable water supply, infectious and parasitic diseases such as malaria and diarrhea are very common. Malnutrition and poor nutrition also are pervasive.

Fees
User fees have been a major deterrent to accessing health care. Various interventions have been devised to improve uptake of health care services, including the distribution of waiver cards to very poor and female-headed households and the introduction of community-based health insurance.

Following the national user fee ban in 2008, a pilot study conducted by the Future Health Systems consortium found a 400% increase in utilization of services that had previously charged fees for services and medicine. The government's strategy to collaborate with non-governmental organisations has led to higher primary health outcomes among the poor, with relatively high levels of perceived health care quality reported by clients in a recent study of primary care services.

Effects of war
The physical and psychological effects of war have substantially increased the need for medical care. In the first quarter of 2019 there were 34 reported attacks on healthcare facilities, at least 87 were closed. At least nine workers and patients were killed.

Pharmaceuticals
There are media reports of low-quality, fake or expired Pakistani and Iranian drugs.  As many patients cannot pay for their prescriptions doctors may give them expired medicines.

Staffing
Average pay for a doctor in  a government hospital is between 12,000-15,000 Afghanis ($151-$189) a month. Most doctors supplement this by working after-hours at private clinics.

Maternal and child health care

Afghanistan made significant improvement in the last decade to its maternal and child health care. According to United States Agency for International Development (USAID), Afghanistan's mortality rate has decreased by about 25% since 2003. It was reported in 2006 that nearly 60% of the population lives within two hours walking distance of the nearest health facility.

The maternal mortality rate is currently 396 deaths/100,000 live births and its infant mortality rate is 66 to 112.8 deaths in every 1,000 live births. The Ministry of Public Health wants to further improve these higher rates by making them normal. 

The country has about 38,000 midwives but more are needed. According to Sima Ayubi, a maternity doctor in Kabul who advocates hospital births, explains: "Now pregnant women have more information about health. This mortality rate is still a problem. There's just a decrease. The problem is not completely eliminated or under control."

According to a 2012 report by Save the Children, improved healthcare and the rise of females attending school have made Afghanistan climb up from its position as the worst place on earth to be a mother. "More mothers are surviving and fewer children are dying and this is something we need to be celebrating," said Rachel Maranto, Advocacy and Mobilisation senior Manager at Save the Children in Kabul.

Treatment in other countries
Afghans spend an estimated $300 million a year on medical treatment abroad, mostly in Pakistan, India and Turkey.

See also 
Health in Afghanistan
COVID-19 pandemic in Afghanistan

References

External links
Afghanistan’s Health Care System Is Collapsing Under Stress (New York Times, Feb. 6, 2022)
No pay for staff. No patient supplies. No heat. This is health care in Afghanistan (NPR, Dec. 21, 2021)

Afghan